The Ameringkogel is a mountain in the Alps located in Austria. It is the highest peak of the Styrian Prealps.

Geography 
Administratively the mountain belongs the Austrian state of Styria.

References

External links 
The Ameringkogel

Two-thousanders of Austria
Mountains of the Alps
Mountains of Styria
Lavanttal Alps